"Cherish" is a song by American R&B band Kool & the Gang, released in May 1985. It was the third single released from the band's sixteenth studio album, Emergency. It was certified Gold by the RIAA and held the number 1 position on Billboard's Adult Contemporary chart for six weeks running. It would ultimately rank as the biggest Adult Contemporary chart hit of the 1980s.

The song is a romantic ballad that proved to be extremely popular when it was released and has since been a wedding song staple of sorts.

The song was composed in the key of B minor, though the chorus shifts to D major (the relative major of B minor).

Different mixes
There are several different mixes of "Cherish". The original album version (length: 4:47) begins with the sound of a wave crashing on the beach followed by a (solely) keyboard intro. The entire first verse is sung without drums and percussion, which do not begin until the first chorus.

The single (and video) version of "Cherish" (length: 3:58) adds additional "beach" effects at the beginning and combines an acoustic guitar with the original keyboard introduction. Additional drumming, which this time starts immediately after J.T. Taylor begins singing the first verse, is also added throughout the song. Whereas the chorus is repeated (sung twice) after the first verse in the album version, it is only sung one time on the single; several bars of music are also cut from the outro.

There is also an extended 12-inch version of "Cherish" (length: 5:43) which includes the same flourishes that were added to the single/video version of the tune, plus saxophone parts during various sections of the song (introduction, bridge, etc.), including a whole additional sax interlude after the first chorus.

Furthermore, there is an edited mix of this 12-inch version (length: 4:22), where the bridge that appears in all of the other versions of the song is replaced by the same saxophone interlude that is included in the full 12-inch version.

Chart performance
"Cherish" peaked at number two on the Billboard Hot 100 chart in September 1985, remaining in the runner-up position for three weeks, behind "Money for Nothing" by Dire Straits. It was a number-one hit on both the R&B and adult contemporary charts in the US, spending one week atop the R&B chart and six weeks atop the AC chart. In the UK, the song reached number four on the UK Singles Chart and remained there for three weeks.

Weekly charts

Year-end charts

Pappa Bear version

Samples and lyrics from this song were used in Pappa Bear's song of the same name in 1997. This version was largely unknown in America, where the music video was set, but experienced significant chart success in Europe and Australia, peaking at number one in New Zealand for three weeks and charting within the top five in Austria, Germany, the Netherlands and Switzerland.

Track listing
CD maxi
 "Cherish" (Radio) – 3:52	
 "Cherish" (Extended) – 5:37	
 "One 4 Da Money" – 5:02	
 "Xtra Large" – 4:10

Charts

Weekly charts

Year-end charts

Certifications

Other cover versions

 The song was covered in 2006 by British glamour model Katie Price and her then husband, pop singer Peter Andre. The track is included on their 2006 album of duets A Whole New World.
 In 2008, R&B singer Alexander O'Neal covered the song on his album, Alex Loves.
 Contemporary Christian artist The Katinas covered the song on their 2013 album Love Chapter where it was titled "Cherish The Love".
 In 2021, Frank Farian and his daughter Yanina recorded a cover version titled "Cherish (The Life)".

See also
List of number-one adult contemporary singles of 1985 (U.S.)
List of number-one R&B singles of 1985 (U.S.)

References

1985 singles
1997 singles
1980s ballads
Kool & the Gang songs
Pop ballads
Contemporary R&B ballads
Soul ballads
RPM Top Singles number-one singles
1984 songs
De-Lite Records singles
Songs written by Ronald Bell (musician)
Songs written by James "J.T." Taylor
Songs written by Claydes Charles Smith
Songs written by Robert "Kool" Bell
Number-one singles in New Zealand